Cradle of Eternity is the debut solo album by Wagakki Band lead vocalist Yuko Suzuhana, released on November 23, 2016 by Avex Trax in three editions: CD only, two-disc CD, and CD with DVD or Blu-ray. In contrast to Wagakki Band's style of mixing traditional Japanese musical instruments (wagakki) with heavy metal, the album features a more mainstream J-pop sound. Initial releases of the album included a trading card with a code to download the character  for the PS Vita game SD Gundam G Generation Genesis. A mu-mo Shop exclusive release included a keychain of Yuko Ortensia.

The album peaked at No. 6 on Oricon's albums chart.

Track listing

Charts

References

External links 
 
 
 

2016 debut albums
Japanese-language albums
Avex Trax albums